Jeffrey Charles Alexander (born 1947) is an American sociologist, and a prominent social theorist. He is the founding figure in the school of cultural sociology he refers to as the "strong program".

Career
He was born May 30, 1947, in Milwaukee, Wisconsin. Alexander gained his Bachelor of Arts degree from Harvard University in 1969 and his Doctor of Philosophy degree from the University of California, Berkeley, in 1978.  He was originally interested in Marxist sociology and followed the work of Fred Block and debates in the journal Socialist Revolution, but evolved to a democratic socialist, then left liberal position.

Later he worked with Neil Smelser, Robert N. Bellah, and Leo Lowenthal. Each of whom were on his dissertation committee, with the chair being Bellah, a former student of Talcott Parsons. Alexander's dissertation, Theoretical Logic in Sociology, was published as a four-volume set. Volume 1 was subtitled Positivism, Presuppositions, and Current Controversies, Volume 2 was The Antimonies of Classical Thought: Marx and Durkheim, Volume 3 was The Classical Attempt at Theoretical Synthesis: Max Weber, and Volume 4 was subtitled The Modern Reconstruction of Classical Thought: Talcott Parsons. At the time, many theorists were attempting to revive Parsons after a decade of criticisms, and Alexander's Theoretical Logic in Sociology was part of this revival.

He worked at the University of California, Los Angeles, from 1974 until joining Yale University in 2001, where (as of 2008) he is the Lillian Chavenson Saden Professor of Sociology and co-director of the Center for Cultural Sociology.

Alexander has authored or co-authored ten books. He was one of the editors of the journal Sociological Theory, and he is currently co-editor of the American Journal of Cultural Sociology.

He received honorary doctorates from La Trobe University, Melbourne and the University College Dublin, Ireland. In 2004, he won the Clifford Geertz Award for Best Article in Cultural Sociology and in 2008, he won the Mary Douglas Prize for Best Book in Cultural Sociology. He also received the 2007 Theory Prize from the Theory Section of the American Sociological Association for best theoretical article. In 2009, he received The Foundation Mattei Dogan Prize in Sociology by the International Sociological Association, awarded every four years in recognition of lifetime accomplishments to "a scholar of very high standing in the profession and of outstanding international reputation."

Notable students of Jeffrey Alexander include Ronald Jacobs, Philip Smith, Isaac Reed, Matthew Norton, and Elizabeth Breese.

Neofunctionalism
In sociology, neofunctionalism represents a revival of the thought of Talcott Parsons by Jeffrey C. Alexander, who sees neofunctionalism as having five central tendencies:
to create a form of functionalism that is multidimensional and includes micro as well as macro levels of analysis
to push functionalism to the left and reject Parsons's optimism about modernity
to argue for an implicit democratic thrust in functional analysis
to incorporate a conflict orientation, and
to emphasize uncertainty and interactional creativity.

While Parsons consistently viewed actors as analytical concepts, Alexander defines action as the movement of concrete, living, breathing persons as they make their way through time and space. In addition he argues that every action contains a dimension of free will, by which he is expanding functionalism to include some of the concerns of symbolic interactionism.

The cultural turn and the strong program

Starting in the late 1980s, Alexander's work turned toward cultural sociology. Key to this cultural turn was a shift in emphasis from an engagement with Parsonian structural functionalism toward a rereading of Emile Durkheim's later works, which featured a strong interest in cultural systems. Durkheim's Elementary Forms of Religious Life was key to Alexander's thought, as in this work Durkheim analyzes the ways by which collective representations emerge and function, as well as the role of rituals in maintaining solidarity and reiterating society's norms and values to the congregation. Alexander picks up specifically on Durkheim's suggestion that the religious processes observed in tribal societies are as pertinent in modern societies. Regardless of whether modern societies believe themselves to be rational and secular, their civil life and processes, claims Alexander, are underpinned by collective representations, by strong emotional ties and by various narratives that—much like tribal societies—tell society what it believes it is and what values it holds sacred.

Alexander distinguishes between the sociology of culture and cultural sociology. The sociology of culture sees culture as a dependent variable—that is, a product of extra-cultural factors such as the economy or interest-laden politics—whereas cultural sociology sees culture as having more autonomy and gives more weight to inner meanings. In other words, in Alexander's conception of cultural sociology assumes that ideas and symbolic processes may have an independent effect on social institutions, on politics, and on culture itself. Alexander strongly distinguishes this sociological perspective from the then-dominant Bourdieusian sociological framework, which tends to see cultural processes as embedded in power struggles, and ultimately in material inequality.

Cultural trauma
Two of his earlier articles can be seen as precursors to his more direct engagement with the topic of trauma. In one, he demonstrates that the Holocaust was not immediately perceived as universally signifying universal evil for Western societies. Rather than that, it was constructed as such by way of a long process of narration and signification. In the second, he shows that the Watergate Crisis was originally not perceived by American society as much more than a minor incident. Here, too, the incident had to be culturally narrated and constructed as compromising the core values of American society, turning what was first thought to be a mundane faux-pas into a full-fledged scandal. A key claim of both studies is that even events that are currently thought of as deeply traumatic for civil society are not inherently devastating but are rather constructed as such through cultural processes.

More generally, Alexander differentiates "cultural trauma" from what he calls "lay trauma" in social thought. "Lay trauma" refers to the idea that certain events are inherently traumatic to the individuals who experience them—for example, the idea of trauma in psychology. However, "cultural trauma" approach cannot assume that any event—as horrendous as it may be—will turn into a trauma for the collective who encounters it. As Alexander explains, "[C]ultural trauma occurs when members of a collectivity feel they have been subjected to a horrendous event that leaves indelible marks upon their group consciousness, marking their memories forever and changing their future identity in fundamental and irrevocable ways".

Social performance
In the mid-2000s Alexander turned attention toward the ways actors create social or cultural performances, which are "the social process[es] by which actors, individually or in concert, display for others the meaning of their social situation". Actors, claims Alexander, care deeply about having others believe the meanings they attempt to convey, and to this end they seek to create a performance as authentic-looking as possible. To do so, they engage in what Alexander calls "cultural pragmatics" and draw upon the various elements of social performance: the systems of collective representation, means of symbolic production, mise-en-scène arrangements (much like a theater production would).

Alexander claims that in tribal societies the various elements of cultural performance were tightly fused, and were employed in collective rituals in which the entire tribe partook and its members experienced first-hand. In modern societies, these various elements became de-fused (as per Weber's sphere differentiation) and for this reason actors who wish to appear authentic must draw upon various repertoires. "Fusion", in Alexander's terms, is the moment in a performance when the various elements click together, generate an effective performance, and ultimately move the audience to psychological identification with the actors. A failed performance will be one that the audience will perceive as inauthentic, and will not develop the sense of identification the actors desired.

Iconic consciousness
In recent years, Alexander has turned attention towards the material aspects of culture, extending his specific strand of cultural sociology towards aesthetics and particularly icons. As he defines it, iconic consciousness occurs "when an aesthetically shaped materiality signifies social value. Contact with this aesthetic surface, whether by sight, smell, taste, touch provides a sensual experience that transmits meaning ...". In contradistinction with various sociologies of culture that have tended to see the visual or the material as a form of falsity or degradation, Alexander draws on the Durkheimian notion of the symbolic collective representation to argue that the ways in which culture operates—both in instilling and in recreating values—is intrinsically tied to symbolic material forms.

Studies following Alexander's approach have looked, for example, into the ways in which architecture is embedded in a deep meaning structure and have deep emotional resonance with the society that frequents them. Others have extended the idea of iconic consciousness into the realm of celebrities, and have explored the ways in which celebrities on one hand present an appealing aesthetic "surface" and on the other hand condense and convey a locus of "deep" meanings that resonate with the audience.

Performative revolutions
Following the Egyptian Revolution, Alexander conducted a study of the revolutionary months from a cultural sociological point of view, applying some of his previous theories in order to understand the ways in which the various protests voiced by demonstrators, journalists, bloggers, and public actors ultimately persuaded the Egyptian army to turn against the regime. The key to understanding the revolution, claims Alexander, is in the binary structure these various actors applied to the Moubarak regime, persuasively depicting it as corrupt and outdated and thereby convincing the wider public that it was a menace to Egyptian society.

Key publications

Selected articles
Alexander, Jeffrey C. The Societalization of Social Problems: Church Pedophilia, Phone Hacking, and the Financial Crisis. American Sociological Review, 83 (6): 1049–1078, 2018.
Alexander, Jeffrey C. Culture trauma, morality and solidarity: The social construction of ‘Holocaust’ and other mass murders. Thesis Eleven, 132 (1): 3–16, 2016.
Alexander, Jeffrey C. The Fate of the Dramatic in Modern Society: Social Theory and the Theatrical Avant-Guarde. Theory, Culture & Society, 31 (1): 3-24, 2014.
Alexander, Jeffrey C. Iconic Power and Performance: the Role of the Critic. In: Iconic Power: Materiality and Meaning in Social Life, editor (with Dominik Bartmanski and Bernhard Giesen), Palgrave Macmillan, 25–38, 2012. 
Alexander, Jeffrey C. Clifford Geertz and the Strong Program: The Human Sciences and Cultural Sociology. Cultural Sociology, 2(2): 157–169, 2008.
Alexander, Jeffrey C. Iconic Consciousness: The Material Feeling of Meaning. Environment and Planning D: Society and Space, 26: 782–794. 2008.
Alexander, Jeffrey C. On the Social Construction of Moral Universals. Reprinted in: Alexander et al., Cultural Trauma and Collective Identity. University of California Press, 196–263, 2004.
Alexander Jeffrey C. Cultural Pragmatics: Social Performance between Ritual and Strategy. Sociological Theory 22: 527–573. 2004.
Alexander, Jeffrey C. From the Depths of Despair: Performance and Counter-Performance on September 11.. Sociological Theory 22 (1) 2004: 88–105.
Alexander, Jeffrey C. Durkheim's Religious Revival, with Philip Smith (Review Essay, E. Durkheim/K. E. Fields trans., The Elementary Forms of Religious Life). American Journal of Sociology, 102 (2): 585–592, 1996.
Alexander, Jeffrey C. Habermas' New Critical Theory: Its Promise and Problems . American Journal of Sociology. 91: 400–424, 1985
Alexander, Jeffrey C. Formal and Substantive Voluntarism in the Work of Talcott Parsons: A Theoretical and Ideological Reinterpretation. American Sociological Review, 43: 177–198, 1978.

Recent books
Obama Power (with Bernadette Jaworsky, Polity 2014)
The Dark Side of Modernity (Polity 2013)
Trauma: A Social Theory (Polity 2012)
Performative Revolution in Egypt: An Essay in Cultural Power (Bloomsbury USA, 2011)
Performance and Power (Polity, 2011)
Interpreting Clifford Geertz: Cultural Investigation in the Social Sciences (Palgrave Macmillan, 2011) (ed., with Philip Smith and Matthew Norton)
The Performance of Politics: Obama's Victory and the Democratic Struggle for Power (Oxford University Press, 2010)
The New Social Theory Reader (2nd edn) (Routledge, 2008) (with Steven Seidman)
A Contemporary Introduction to Sociology: Culture and Society in Transition (Paradigm Publishers, 2008) (with Kenneth Thompson)
The Civil Sphere (Oxford University Press, 2006)
Social Performance: Symbolic Action, Cultural Pragmatics, and Ritual (Cambridge University Press, 2006) (with Bernhard Giesen and Jason Mast)
The Cambridge Companion to Durkheim (Cambridge University Press, 2005), (ed., with Philip Smith)
Cultural Trauma and Collective Identity (University of California Press, 2004) (with Ron Eyerman, Bernhard Giesen, Neil J. Smelser and Piotr Sztompka)
The Meanings of Social Life: A Cultural Sociology (Oxford University Press, 2003)
Narrating Trauma: On the Impact of Collective Suffering (Paradigm Publishers, 2011) (with Ron Eyerman and Elizabeth Butler Breese)

References

Footnotes

Bibliography

 
 
 
 
 
 
 
 
 
 
 
 
 
 
 
 

American sociologists
Yale University faculty
Harvard University alumni
University of California, Berkeley alumni
Living people
1947 births